Stenoptilia kiitulo is a moth of the family Pterophoroidea. It is found in Tanzania on heights of 2600 to 2700 metres. The species is named after the region of occurrence, the Kiitulo Plateau.

The wingspan is 19–22 mm. The moth flies in November and December.

External links
Ten new species of Afrotropical Pterophoridae (Lepidoptera)

Endemic fauna of Tanzania
kiitulo
Insects of Tanzania
Moths of Africa
Moths described in 2008
Taxa named by Cees Gielis